The Chicago and Northwestern Railroad Depot is a historic former railroad station in Fond du Lac, Wisconsin. The station is located on the southeast corner of Forest Avenue and Brooke Street.

Rail service in Fond du Lac can be traced as far back as 1852, although Fond du Lac was also the namesake of the former Chicago, St. Paul and Fond du Lac Railroad, which existed from 1855 to 1859 before going bankrupt and being acquired by the Chicago and Northwestern Railway. In 1891 C&NW replaced the original station with the current one. The building's architect was Charles Sumner Frost. A near-identical twin station was built, also in 1891, in Dekalb, Illinois.

The station served trains such as the Flambeau 400 and Peninsula 400 until it was closed in 1975, well after most intercity passenger service in the United States was turned over to Amtrak in 1971, which never used this station.

The Chicago and Northwestern Railroad Depot was added to the National Register of Historic Places on August 10, 1990. Today it houses several small shops, and the former right-of-way is a rail trail. An active railroad line exists west of the station, but that line was operated by Soo Line and no longer contains a station nearby.

References

External links
Fond du Lac Train Depot (Facebook)

Romanesque Revival architecture in Wisconsin
Railway stations in the United States opened in 1891
Fond du Lac, Wisconsin
Fond du Lac

Railway stations on the National Register of Historic Places in Wisconsin
National Register of Historic Places in Fond du Lac County, Wisconsin
Former railway stations in Wisconsin